The eighth season of the American legal drama Suits was ordered on January 30, 2018, and began airing on USA Network in the United States July 18, 2018.

The season is the first in the show's history to see extensive cast changes with the departures of Patrick J. Adams and Meghan Markle at the conclusion of the previous season. Following their departures, three actors have been promoted to series regulars: previously recurring guest star Amanda Schull as Katrina Bennett, recurring special guest star Dulé Hill as Alex Williams, and Katherine Heigl as Samantha Wheeler, who is introduced in the season premiere.

The back half of the season premiered on January 23, 2019.

Cast

Regular cast
 Gabriel Macht as Harvey Specter
 Rick Hoffman as Louis Litt
 Sarah Rafferty as Donna Paulsen
 Amanda Schull as Katrina Bennett
 Dulé Hill as Alex Williams
 Katherine Heigl as Samantha Wheeler

Special Guest Cast
 David Costabile as Daniel Hardman

Recurring cast
 Wendell Pierce as Robert Zane
 Rachael Harris as Sheila Sazs
 Aloma Wright as Gretchen Bodinski
 Ray Proscia as Dr. Stan Lipschitz
 Jake Epstein as Brian Altman

Guest cast
 Abigail Spencer as Dana Scott
 Gary Cole as Cameron Dennis
 Jeffrey Nordling as Eric Kaldor 
 Usman Ally as Andrew Malik
 Neal McDonough as Sean Cahill
 Sasha Roiz as Thomas Kessler
 Ian Reed Kesler as Stu Buzzini

Episodes

Production

Development
On May 25, 2018, Entertainment Weekly released an interview with Katherine Heigl in which she described her character Samantha Wheeler as a "fierce and enigmatic lawyer who muscles her way into [the] central law firm, Zane Specter Litt." She also teased an antagonistic relationship between Samantha and the main protagonist Harvey Specter and an "uneasy dynamic" with Donna. The article included several exclusive first-look images from the season premiere and Heigl's character.

Series creator Aaron Korsh confirmed that Patrick J. Adams won't be returning for any guest appearances in the first ten episodes of the season. However, he did state that he and Adams had discussed it and are both open to the possibility somewhere in the future. At the same time, he confirmed that Gina Torres won't guest star on the eighth season nor will there be crossover episodes in order to establish the world from the Chicago-based spin-off series Pearson as separate from Suits itself.

Ratings

References

External links 
 
 

08
2018 American television seasons
2019 American television seasons